Isenburg-Eisenberg was the name of a junior, non-immediate line of the House of Isenburg. It was partitioned from Isenburg-Offenbach in 1711, and became extinct in 1758.

Counties of the Holy Roman Empire
House of Isenburg